The Armenian Catholic Patriarchal Exarchate of Damascus is a pre-diocesan missionary jurisdiction of the Armenian Catholic Church sui iuris (Eastern Catholic, Armenian Rite in Armenian language) in part of Syria.

It depends directly on the Armenian Catholic Patriarch of Cilicia, without belonging to his or any other ecclesiastical province.

Its see is the Marian Church of the Queen of the Universe, in the Syrian national capital Damascus.

History 
Established on 6 November 1984 as Patriarchal Exarchate of Damascus (Arabic Aš-Šām).

Ordinaries 
(all Armenian Rite)

Patriarchal Exarchs of Damascus 
 Father Kevork Tayroyan (1984 – 1997)
 Joseph Arnaouti, Patriarchal Clergy Institute of Bzommar (I.C.P.B.) (1997 – ...); previously Eparch (Bishop) of Kameshli of the Armenians (Syria) (1989.08.21 – 1992.04.10), Auxiliary Eparch of San Gregorio de Narek en Buenos Aires of the Armenians (Argentina) (1994.05.24 – 1997), Bishop of Curia of the Armenian Catholics (1997 – 1999)

See also 
 Catholic Church in Syria

References

External links 
 GCatholic with incumbent biography links

Damascus
Damascus
Armenian Catholic Church in Syria